Leela Savasta is a Canadian actress. She played Clair Crosby in the 2006 film Black Christmas. She is best known for her supporting roles in the television shows, Battlestar Galactica as Tracey Anne, Cra$h & Burn as Lucia Silva and Lorna Salazar in Intelligence.

Life and career
Savasta was born in Vancouver, British Columbia, Canada, where she currently resides. She has appeared in such television shows as Smallville, Intelligence, Supernatural and the Showtime series Masters of Horror. She played the characters Dr. Esposito and then Captain Alicia Vega in two episodes of the fifth season of Stargate: Atlantis, and had a recurring role on Battlestar Galactica as Tracey Anne. She played the girlfriend of Douglas Fargo in season 3.5 of the TV show Eureka.

Savasta starred as Lucia, the girlfriend of lead character Jimmy Burn (Luke Kirby), on the Showcase television drama Cra$h & Burn. She also stars in the Lifetime docudrama The Craigslist Killer, alongside Jake McDorman, William Baldwin, and Agnes Bruckner. Savasta plays Julissa Brisman, a masseuse allegedly murdered by Philip Markoff in Boston in 2009.

She had a role in the 2012 film This Means War, starring Chris Pine, Tom Hardy, and Reese Witherspoon.

Filmography

Film

Television

References

External links

Actresses from Vancouver
Canadian film actresses
Canadian people of Latin American descent
Canadian television actresses
Living people
Year of birth missing (living people)